Bean Blossom Airport  was a privately owned public-use airport  southwest of the central business district of New Lothrop, in Shiawassee County, Michigan.

Facilities and aircraft 
For the year ending December 31, 2004, the airport had 100 general aviation aircraft operations.

References

External links 
 Aerial image as of April 1998 from USGS The National Map

Airports in Michigan
Defunct airports in Michigan
Transportation in Shiawassee County, Michigan